Sir John Wither Awdry DL (21 October 1795 – 31 May 1878) was an English-born Indian judge.

Born at Swindon, he was the second and oldest surviving son of John Awdry and his wife Jane, the second daughter of Lovelace Bigg. Awdry was educated at Westminster School and then at Christ Church, Oxford. He was first in classics in 1816 and graduated with a Master of Arts ten years later. In 1844, Awdry received a Doctorate of Civil Law by the University of Oxford.

Awdry was called to the bar by the Middle Temple in 1822 and became a bencher in 1830, on whose occasion he was created a Knight Bachelor. He was puisne judge and commissioner of the Insolvent Debtor's Court in Bombay. In 1839, he was appointed chief justice of the Supreme Court of Judicature at Bombay, resigning from this post after three years. After his return to England, Awdry served as chairman of the Quarter Sessions in Wiltshire and represented the county as Deputy Lieutenant from 1852.

On 29 June 1830, he married firstly Sarah Maria, eldest daughter of Jonathan Awdry, and had by her two sons and a daughter. After her death, he married Frances Ellen, second daughter of Thomas Carr on 24 July 1839. By his second wife, he had eight sons and four daughters. Awdry died at his home at Notton House. His sons included William, an Anglican bishop, and Charles, senior partner of W. H. Smith. He was the paternal grandfather of the writer and clergyman Wilbert Awdry.

References

1795 births
1878 deaths
Alumni of Christ Church, Oxford
Deputy Lieutenants of Wiltshire
Judges of the Bombay High Court
Members of the Middle Temple
Knights Bachelor
People educated at Westminster School, London